Jane McGonigal (born October 21, 1977) is an American author, game designer, and researcher. McGonigal advocates using mobile and digital technology to channel positive attitudes and collaboration in a real-world context.

Biography

Early years 
McGonigal was brought up in New Jersey. Her parents are teachers who emphasized intellectual attainment. Her identical twin sister, Kelly McGonigal, is a psychologist.

Education
McGonigal received her Bachelor of Arts in English from Fordham University in 1999, and her Ph.D. in Performance Studies from the University of California, Berkeley in 2006. She was the first in the department to study computer and video games.

Personal life
In 2009, she suffered a debilitating concussion that helped her develop a game, Jane the Concussion Slayer, for treating her concussion and other similar conditions; the game was later renamed SuperBetter.

Philosophy

McGonigal writes and speaks about alternate reality games and massively multiplayer online gaming. She also writes about the way that collective intelligence can be generated and used as a means for improving the quality of human life or working towards the solution of social ills. She has stated that gaming should be moving "towards Nobel Prizes."

McGonigal has been called "the current public face of gamification." Despite this, McGonigal has objected to the word, stating, "I don't do 'gamification,' and I'm not prepared to stand up and say I think it works. I don't think anybody should make games to try to motivate somebody to do something they don't want to do. If the game is not about a goal you're intrinsically motivated by, it won't work."

Career 
After earning her Bachelor of Arts in English, McGonigal started developing her first commercial games. As a designer, McGonigal became known for location-based and alternate reality games. She has taught game design and game studies at the San Francisco Art Institute and the University of California, Berkeley. In 2008, she became the Director of Game Research and Development at Institute for the Future, and in 2012, the Chief Creative Officer at SuperBetter Labs.

Games
McGonigal has been developing commercial games since 2006, some of which are listed in the following chart:

SuperBetter
In July 2009, Jane suffered a concussion after hitting her head in her office. The symptoms were severe and lasted for several weeks. They made her feel suicidal. She requested her friends to give her tasks to do each day.

Wanting to recover from her condition, she created a game to treat it. The game was initially called Jane the Concussion-Slayer (after Buffy the Vampire Slayer), then renamed SuperBetter. McGonigal raised $1 million to fund an expanded version of the game. Additionally, she has collaborated on commissioned games for the Whitney Museum of American Art and the Museum of Contemporary Art, Los Angeles.

Books
On January 20, 2011, McGonigal's first book, Reality Is Broken: Why Games Make us Better and How they Can Change the World, was published. In this book, McGonigal looks at massively multiplayer online gaming and alternate reality games and at games more widely. Using current research from the positive psychology movement, McGonigal argues that games contribute powerfully to human happiness and motivation, a sense of meaning, and community development.

The book was met with a favorable reception from The Los Angeles Times and Wired and mixed reviews from The Independent. The book received criticism from some quarters, notably the Wall Street Journal, which felt that her thesis—which claimed to use games to "fix" everyday life by giving it a sense of achievement and making it seem more fulfilling and optimistic—made "overblown" claims from minor examples, and did not address conflicting individual goals and desires, or the influence of "evil." The New York Times Book Review also criticized some points in her book, citing the lack of evidence demonstrating that in-game behavior and values could translate into solutions to real-world problems such as poverty, disease, and hunger.

On September 15, 2015, McGonigal's second book, SuperBetter: A Revolutionary Approach to Getting Stronger, Happier, Braver, and More Resilient, was published by Penguin Press. It was #7 on the New York Times Best Seller: Advice, How-to, and Miscellaneous List its debut week.

McGonigal's third book, Imaginable: How to See the Future Coming and Feel Ready for Anything―Even Things That Seem Impossible Today, was released on March 22, 2022.

McGonigal has a chapter giving advice in Tim Ferriss' book Tools of Titans.

Recognition 
{| class="wikitable collapsible"
|-
! Date !! Award !! Description
|-
| 2010 || O: The Oprah Magazine "2010 O Power List" || Named in O: The Oprah Magazine as one of 20 important women of 2010 on the "2010 O Power List"
|-
| 2008 || Women in Games: Gamasutra 20 ||Named in the first Gamasutra 20, honoring 20 notable women working in video games.
|-
| 2008 || South by Southwest Interactive Award for Activism || Awarded for World Without Oil 

|-
| 2006 || MIT Technology Review's TR100 || Named one of the world's top innovators under the age of 35 by MIT's Technology Review.
|-
| 2005 || 2005 Innovation Award from the International Game Developers Association and a 2005 Games-related Webby Award. || For I Love Bees, the Halo 2 promotion.
|}

PublicationsReality Is Broken: Why Games Make Us Better and How They Can Change the World. Penguin Press (2011). . SuperBetter: A Revolutionary Approach to Getting Stronger, Happier, Braver and More Resilient. Penguin Press (2015). Imaginable: How to See the Future Coming and Feel Ready for Anything―Even Things That Seem Impossible Today.'' Spiegel & Grau (2022).

References

External links

 
 IT Conversations: Interview on Alternate Reality Gaming (2007)
 Game Changer: A Talk with Jane McGonigal (2011)
 Mother Jones: Wii Shall Overcome (2011)
 Hollywood Reporter: How Video Games Can Change Your Life (2012)
 How Gaming Can Make A Better World: Ted Talk (2010)

1977 births
American video game designers
Living people
Writers from Philadelphia
San Francisco Art Institute faculty
University of California, Berkeley faculty
University of California, Berkeley alumni
Video game researchers
21st-century American women writers
American twins
Women video game designers
Women video game developers
Pervasive games
Identical twins
American women academics